Giovanni Battista Crosato (1686 – July 15, 1758) was an Italian painter of quadratura, active in the 18th century in Piedmont.

He was born in Venice, where he had likely his first training. By 1733 he had moved to Turin, where he was recruited to fresco in the Palazzina of Stupinigi. From 1736 to 1752, he was a member of the painter's guild in Venice, but had returned in 1740 to Turin to work in various churches including the church of the Visitazione di Pinerolo. He also worked as a scenic designer in Turin. He worked with Giovanni Francesco Costa in the Teatro Regio of Turin. In 1749, he collaborated with Gerolamo Mengozzi Colonna in the decorations for the Carnaval of Turin. In 1752, he painted along with Pietro Visentini in the Palazzo Pesaro. He was inducted in the Accademia of Venice in 1756. He also painted in some palaces. Among his pupils was Bernardino Galliari.

References

18th-century Italian painters
Italian male painters
Italian scenic designers
Quadratura painters
1686 births
1758 deaths
18th-century Italian male artists